Pedrerasaurus is an extinct genus of scincogekkonomorph lizard from the Early Cretaceous (Barremian) La Pedrera de Rúbies Formation of Spain. The type species is P. latifrontalis. It is similar in appearance to Meyasaurus, a widespread Early Cretaceous lizard that is also known from the Iberian Peninsula. Both genera have bicuspid (two-cusped) teeth, but unlike Meyasaurus, Pedrerasaurus has frontal bones that are not fused or constricted.

References 

Cretaceous lizards
Barremian life
Cretaceous Spain
Fossils of Spain
Fossil taxa described in 2010